Ammonium diuranate or (ADU) ((NH4)2U2O7), is one of the intermediate chemical forms of uranium produced during yellowcake production. The name "yellowcake" originally given to this bright yellow salt, now applies to mixtures of uranium oxides which are actually hardly ever yellow. It also is an intermediate in mixed-oxide (MOX) fuel fabrication. Although it is usually called "ammonium diuranate" as though it has a "diuranate" ion , this is not necessarily the case. It can also be called diammonium diuranium heptaoxide. The structure is said to be similar to that of uranium dioxide dihydrate.

It is precipitated by adding aqueous ammonium hydroxide after uranium extraction by tertiary amines in kerosene. This precipitate is then thickened and centrifuged before being calcined to uranium oxide. Canadian practice favours the production of uranium oxide from ammonium diuranate, rather than from uranyl nitrate as is the case elsewhere.

Ammonium diuranate was once used to produce colored glazes in ceramics. However when being fired this will decompose to uranium oxide, so the uranate was only used as a lower cost material than the fully purified uranium oxide.

References

Uranates
Nuclear materials
Ammonium compounds